Ahnberg is an unincorporated community in west-central Brookings County, South Dakota, United States.

Geography
Ahnberg is located five miles north of Sinai and 12 miles west of Brookings.

History
Ahnberg is located along the now abandoned South Dakota Central Railroad mainline from Sioux Falls to Watertown.(which it was then bought by the Great Northern Railroad, which then became the Burlington Northern, which was the last operator of the line.)At one time it was thought to be the largest shipping point between Sioux Falls and Watertown.It was formerly called Como, but in 1921 when the post office was established a new name was chosen. The community was named for Oscar Ahnberg, a pioneer farmer living nearby.

Notes

Unincorporated communities in Brookings County, South Dakota
Unincorporated communities in South Dakota